Overland Limited may refer to:

Trains
 Overland Limited (ATSF train), 1901–1915
 Overland Limited (UP train), 1895–1931

Films
 The Overland Limited (1925)
 Several short films made in 1899 and 1901:
Overland Limited (1899)
The 'Overland Limited' Passing Witch Rocks (1899)
A Race with the Overland Limited (1901)
The Overland Limited (1901)

See also
 Overland (disambiguation)